ZIDIDADA is a Danish pop music band formed in 1997 by Jimmy Bacoll (former Colding) and Danny Linde. They picked the name as a notation for eternal sun. The band took part in 2004 in the Dansk Melodi Grand Prix 2004, the selection process for Danish entry to Eurovision Song Contest 2004 to be held in Istanbul with the song "Prinsesse" ending up with 46 points and second overall to the winning song "Sig det' løgn" by Thomas Thordarson that garnered 60 points to represent Denmark. In 2008, the band performed "Take It All", its theme song for the wrestling show, WWE Judgment Day 2008.

Members
Present members
Jimmy Bacoll (former Colding) - vocals
Hans Jacob Krausmann - keyboard, harp, guitar and vocals
Lars Storck - percussion, guitar and vocals
Lars Maasbøl - guitar
Anders Heidelbach Cornelins - bass
Jacob Davidsen - drums
Former members
Danny Linde - guitar (founding member) - Left the band to concentrate on his hard rock music career
Björn Jönsson - drums (Band member 1999-2020) - Died from cancer age 44.

Discography

References

External links
Official website

Danish musical groups